Roma FC may refer to:

 A.S. Roma, professional Italian association football club based in Rome.
 Dallas Roma F.C., amateur American association football club based in Dallas, Texas.
 Roma Rovers FC